The Korea–Russia Friendship Bridge ( Chosŏn–Rossiya Ujŏngŭi Dali) is a rail bridge over the Tumen River. It was commissioned in 1959 as a replacement for a temporary wooden bridge. Located immediately downstream from the China–North Korea–Russia tripoint, the bridge is the sole crossing point on the 17 km long North Korea–Russia border. Planks are laid between the tracks making crossing of road vehicles possible by special arrangement, but it is primarily a rail bridge. The tracks are dual gauge because the Russian railroad system uses a track gauge of 1,520 mm while the North Korean system uses 1,435 mm. The bridge is served by the Khasan railway station on Russian soil and Tumangang Station on the North Korean side of the river.

In October 2017 a fiber optic cable running across the bridge provided North Korea with an additional connection to the global Internet through Russia's TransTelekom provider, a subsidiary of Russian national railway operator Russian Railways. It allows the country to be less dependent on its primary internet connection through China Unicom (similarly running over the Sino-Korean Friendship Bridge), after it was the target of a DDoS attack during the 2017 North Korea crisis.

Use of the bridge was suspended through the COVID-19 pandemic, with use resuming in November 2022.

See also 
 North Korea–Russia relations
 Sino-Korean Friendship Bridge
 Baranovsky-Khasan railway line

References

External links

North Korea–Russia border crossings
Bridges in North Korea
Railway bridges in Russia
Bridges completed in 1959
Bridges built in the Soviet Union
Korea–Soviet Union relations
International bridges
Soviet foreign aid
1959 establishments in Russia
1959 establishments in North Korea